The German Sign Language family is a small language family of sign languages, including German Sign Language, Polish Sign Language and probably Israeli Sign Language. The latter also had influence from Austrian Sign Language, which is unrelated, and the parentage is not entirely clear.

See also
 Swiss German Sign Language

References